R. Earl Dixon (March 11, 1927 – March 16, 2016) was an American politician. He served as a member for the 23rd and 25th district of the Florida House of Representatives.

Life and career 
Dixon was born in Bronson, Florida. He attended the University of Florida.

In 1968, Dixon was elected to represent the 25th district of the Florida House of Representatives, succeeding Gifford Grange Jr. He served until 1972, when he was succeeded by Frank Williams. In the same year, he was elected to represent the 23rd district, succeeding John R. Forbes. He served until 1978, when he was succeeded by Fred Tygart.

Dixon died in March 2016, at the age of 89.

References 

1927 births
2016 deaths
Members of the Florida House of Representatives
Florida Republicans
Florida Democrats
20th-century American politicians
University of Florida alumni